Antonio Greppi (26 June 1894, in Angera – 22 October 1982, in Milan) was an Italian writer, politician and dramaturge. He was the first mayor of Milan after its liberation in 1945.

External links
http://www.anpi.it/donne-e-uomini/antonio-greppi/

1894 births
1982 deaths
People from the Province of Varese
Italian Socialist Party politicians
Italian Democratic Socialist Party politicians
Members of the Constituent Assembly of Italy
Deputies of Legislature III of Italy
Deputies of Legislature IV of Italy
Mayors of Milan
Politicians of Lombardy
Italian male writers
Italian military personnel of World War I
Italian resistance movement members